The 1928–29 season was Port Vale's tenth consecutive season of football (23rd overall) in the English Football League. For the first time in their history they suffered relegation. This was down to poor away form, at home they went a club record 19 games without a draw, picking up all but five of their points in front of their home fans. The season also saw the departure of club legends Tom Page and Wilf Kirkham.

Overview

Second Division
The pre-season saw only the addition of one major player – goalkeeper Jack Prince from Oldham Athletic. Otherwise the club felt confident that they had a nice blend of youth and experience.

The season started with a 4–1 home defeat to Wolves, yet two days later the Vale travelled to The Dell, where they beat Southampton with two Stewart Littlewood goals – this would prove to be their only away victory of the season. Picking up just two wins in September (a 5–2 win over Millwall thanks to a Littlewood hat-trick, and a 2–1 win over Tottenham Hotspur), the club soon found themselves struggling. They also lost 2–1 at Stoke's Victoria Ground in front of 35,288 supporters. Heading into December they won six successive home games to take them into mid-table, including a four-goal haul from Jack Simms to see off Nottingham Forest. December would prove to be the month that killed the Vale. Oakes had a cartilage operation, Gillespie tore an elbow joint, and the team lost six of their seven festive games. In January the popular high-scoring Littlewood was traded to Oldham Athletic for veteran striker Albert Pynegar and £1,300. Falling down the table fast, in late February they were slaughtered 7–1 at Preston North End's Deepdale. Back at The Old Recreation Ground they managed to regularly pick up victories, most notably demolishing West Bromwich Albion 8–1 on 9 March – the biggest victory in the division that season, Pynegar scoring a hat-trick. Further good work picking up three points from Oldham Athletic and beating Chelsea was undone by a horrifying 6–0 defeat at fellow strugglers Barnsley. The "Valiants" beat Bristol City 5–0 in front of a miserable home turnout thanks to a four-goal effort from Pynegar, yet it was too little too late as the club were relegated.

They finished in 21st place with 34 points from 42 games, two points from safety, they suffered relegation for the first time in their history (they had previously failed re-elections). Scoring 71 goals was respectable, however 86 goals conceded was the joint-worst in the league. Their awful away form was not unique, Vale one of four teams with only one away win to their name, though they conceded more on their travels than any other side.

Finances
On the financial side, plans of a new stadium were shelved as the directors channelled money into rebuilding their team. Vic Rouse, Alf Bennett, and David Rollo were let go, Rouse joining Crewe Alexandra. Club legend Tom Page also left the club after racking up 286 Football League appearances. With a £1,223 drop in gate receipts there were fears that the club might close, these fears were heightened when fellow legend Wilf Kirkham was sold to Stoke City for £2,800 (the second highest transfer the club had ever received).

Cup competitions
In the FA Cup, it was a repeat of the 1925–26 season as the club were drawn against Manchester United at home. The First Division club returned to Old Trafford with a 3–0 victory. The end of season North Staffordshire Royal Infirmary Cup was cancelled, with Vale seemingly too despondent to field a team.

League table

Results
Port Vale's score comes first

Football League Second Division

Results by matchday

Matches

FA Cup

Player statistics

Appearances

Top scorers

Transfers

Transfers in

Transfers out

References
Specific

General

Port Vale F.C. seasons
Port Vale